The 1935 Drake Bulldogs football team was an American football team that represented Drake University in the Missouri Valley Conference (MVC) during the 1935 college football season. In its third season under head coach Vee Green, the team compiled a 3–6–1 record (2–2 against MVC opponents), tied for fourth place in the conference, and was outscored by a total of 204 to 141.

Schedule

References

Drake
Drake Bulldogs football seasons
Drake Bulldogs football